The Law for Special Exception of the Imperial House Law concerning Abdication, etc. of Emperor , or in short Emperor Abdication Law , is a Japanese law enacted for the abdication of Akihito, the 125th Emperor of Japan.

The special law was enacted by the National Diet on 9 June 2017 after both houses passed the legislation. The law partially came into effect on 16 June 2017, and fully in effect on 1 May 2019 after the accession and enthronement of the new emperor, Naruhito.

Background 

According to the Imperial Household Law, the Emperor is "on throne until death". The Abdication Law, however, provides legal basis for the abdication of Akihito and the accession of Crown Prince Naruhito, and was described by the Chief Cabinet Secretary as "setting up precedents for the future".

Akihito reportedly revealed his intention to abdicate on 22 July 2010 in a Palace Meeting, admitting his parent's illnesses in their later years, including cancer of Emperor Shōwa and dementia of Empress Kōjun, had impacted him hugely.

NHK, a major Japanese public broadcaster, reported on 13 July 2016 and citing officials of Imperial Household Agency, that "His Majesty the Emperor had expressed his intention to abdicate for Crown Prince Naruhito in the coming few years". The Agency initially rejected the report as "impossible" and "unrealistic".

On 8 August, the Emperor made his second-ever televised address to the public. Akihito said his declining health means it is difficult to fulfil his duties, which strongly indicated his wish to abdicate as he was barred from making political statements according to the constitution. Prime Minister Shinzo Abe said the government would take the remarks seriously and discuss what could be done.

Legislation 
The cabinet convened 14 meetings on "reducing the burden of Emperor's duties" in 2016 and 2017. On 21 April 2017, the final report of the meetings was published which recommended the enactment of new law by the National Diet. The proposed bill would allow Akihito to abdicate and be conferred the title of "Emperor Emeritus", while Empress Michiko, wife of Akihito, will be called "Empress Emeritus". Both will retain the title of "Majesty". The Imperial Household Agency will be reformed by creating "Department of Emperor Emeritus" and "Department of Crown Prince".

All parliamentary parties were invited to send representatives over drafting of the bill by virtue of Article 1 of the Constitution, which said "The Emperor shall be the symbol of the State and of the unity of the People, deriving his position from the will of the people with whom resides sovereign power."

The bill was agreed by the cabinet in the meeting on 19 May 2017, and was sent to the National Diet on the same day. Following discussion in a committee of the House of Representatives on 1 June, the bill was passed in the House of Representatives with a simple majority on the next day - noticeably that no independent member or parties indicate objection.

The House of Councillors, the upper house, then established the "Special Bills Committee on the Law for Special Exception of the Imperial House Law concerning Abdication, etc. of Emperor" for further discussion. The Councillors passed the bill on 9 June without objection, but the Liberal Party abstained the vote, saying the abdication shall be handled by the amendment to the Imperial Household Law. The law came into effect on 16 June.

A resolution was included in the bill, which confirmed "the Government will take into account the shrinking of the imperial family, and will consider various measures regarding the imperial succession, including the establishment of female palace, and to timely report to the National Diet."

The opposition party, the Constitutional Democratic Party, formed a study group on studying the possibility of absolute primogeniture (i.e. to allow female succession to the crown) and to make abdication procedures permanent.

Subsequent decisions 

Following the passage of bill into law, the Government started planning the timeline of the abdication and to decide on the new era name.

On 1 December 2017, Imperial Household Council decided the abdication will take place on 30 April 2019. The abdication had once considered to be held on 31 March 2019 and the accession on the next day, but was abandoned because of the potential political impact by the local elections.

The cabinet agreed the abdication date on 8 December 2017, and the decree was gazetted on 13 December. The decree which provides legal basis for the abdication ceremony was also promulgated on 9 March 2018 after cabinet's decision on 6 March.

On 1 April 2019, the cabinet decided on the details of announcement of the new era name, and that the new era name shall came to effect on 1 May 2019. Crown Prince Naruhito became the 126th Emperor at the midnight of 1 May 2019, and the era name was changed from Heisei to Reiwa simultaneously.

Provisions 
Section 1 (Preamble) provides the background information of Akihito, which includes the health issues and the necessity of abdication. Section 2 (Abdication of Emperor and Succession by Crown Prince) stipulates that the abdication and succession will happen on "enforcement date". Section 3 (Emperor Emeritus) and Section 4 (Empress Emeritus) stipulate, respectively, the title of Emperor Akihito and Empress Michiko after abdication. Section 5 (Crown Prince after succession to the throne) confers the title of crown prince to Fumihito, Naruhito's brother.

The annexes of the law provides further details in connection with the abdication, including the enforcement and expiry date of the law, application of laws related to Emperor and Empress Emeritus and the finance of the Imperial Family, taxation, exemption of public consultation, amendment to the Imperial Household, Public Holiday Law and Imperial Household Agency Law.

Notes

References 

2017 in Japanese politics
2017 in law
Succession acts
Japanese imperial history